The Seraphic Clockwork is the sixth full-length album by the German progressive metal band Vanden Plas released through Frontiers Records.

Track listing

 "Frequency" (M: S. Lill; L: Kuntz) – 6:16
 "Holes in the Sky" (M: S. Lill; L: Kuntz) – 5:26
 "Scar of an Angel" (M: S. Lill; L: Kuntz) – 7:27
 "Sound of Blood" (M: Werno; L: Kuntz) – 6:47
 "The Final Murder" (M: S. Lill; L: Kuntz) – 9:54
 "Quicksilver" (M: Werno; L: Kuntz) – 8:54
 "Rush of Silence" (M: Werno; L: Kuntz) – 9:23
 "On My Way to Jerusalem" (M: S. Lill; L: Kuntz) – 12:51
 "Eleyson" (bonus track, from the Ludus Danielis musical) – 5:33

Personnel

Andy Kuntz – Vocals
Stephan Lill – Guitars
Günter Werno – Keyboards
Torsten Reichert – Bass
Andreas Lill – Drums

References

2010 albums
Vanden Plas (band) albums
Frontiers Records albums